NGC 4976 is a peculiar elliptical galaxy in the constellation Centaurus. It was detected with a 5" telescope working at 20x magnification by comet hunter Jack Bennett.

References

External links

Elliptical galaxies
Peculiar galaxies
Centaurus (constellation)
4976
45562